SOCIS is a political sociology company in Ukraine. It was one of the companies that performed rolling and exit polls for Ukrainian elections in 1998,  2002, 2004, and Ukrainian referendum in 2000. The company has been a member of The Gallup Organization since 1994. In 1999-2002 the original company has forked into TNS Ukraine and became a part of the Taylor Nelson Sofres market research group.

Results of exit polls performed by this company during the Ukrainian presidential election in 2004 were used as one of arguments leading to the Orange Revolution.

References

External links
 

Public opinion research companies
Privately held companies of Ukraine
Sociological research companies of Ukraine
Companies established in 1993
Ukrainian companies established in 1993